The steam locomotives of Oldenburg Class B of the Grand Duchy of Oldenburg State Railways were built in the early 1900s for working the metre gauge network on the German island of Wangerooge.

Initially one example was ordered in 1904 from Freudenstein & Co. in Berlin. This tank engine weighed only 9.4 t when empty and could carry 1.2 m³ of water and 0.35 tonnes of coal. It had a well tank and the coal bunkers were on the left and right hand side of the boiler. The engine drove the second axle and the locomotive had the number 3.

In 1910 a somewhat heavier and larger locomotive was ordered from Hanomag. It weighed in at 12.2 tonnes (service weight). Because this engine acquitted itself well, in 1913 another one was ordered. These two locomotives were given numbers 4 and 5. 
After the formation of the Reichsbahn the engines were taken over, classified as DRG Class 99.02 and given the numbers 99 021–023. In 1942 locomotives 99 021 and 99 022 had to be handed over for wartime duties at the Eastern front where they disappeared without trace.

Number 99 023 remained on Wangerooge and underwent a minor rebuild. It was given larger water tanks, wooden window shutters and an electrically operated lantern. It was retired in 1957.

See also
Grand Duchy of Oldenburg State Railways
List of Oldenburg locomotives and railbuses
Länderbahnen

References 

 
 

0-4-0T locomotives
B
Metre gauge steam locomotives
Railway locomotives introduced in 1904
Hanomag locomotives
B n2t locomotives